Major General Sanjeewa Munasinghe, RWP, RSP, VSV, USP is a Sri Lankan military physician. He is the Secretary to the Ministry of Health and former Director General, Army Health Services and Colonel Commandant of the Sri Lanka Army Medical Corps.

Educated at Kalutara Tissa Central Collage, Munasinghe graduated from the Faculty of Medicine, University of Ruhuna with a MBBS in 1986 and joined the Sri Lanka Army that year. Having completed his basic officer training at the Sri Lanka Military Academy, he was commissioned as a captain in the Sri Lanka Army Medical Corps. Munasinghe who qualified as a consultant radiologist, served with the Army Medical Services during the course of the Sri Lankan Civil War, gaining the gallantry medals, Rana Wickrama Padakkama, Rana Sura Padakkama and the distinguish service medals Vishista Seva Vibhushanaya, Uttama Seva Padakkama. He served as the President of Sri Lanka College of Military Medicine. In 2010 he was appointed as the Colonel Commandant of Army Medical Corps and in 2014 he was appointed the first Director General Army Health Services with the rank of major general. In May 2020, he was appointed Secretary to the Ministry of Health by President Gotabaya Rajapaksa.

References 

Sri Lankan major generals
Sinhalese military personnel
Permanent secretaries of Sri Lanka
Sri Lankan military doctors
Sri Lanka Army Medical Corps officers
Alumni of the University of Ruhuna
Sri Lanka Military Academy graduates
Living people
1959 births